The 2008 Big 12 Conference softball tournament was held at ASA Hall of Fame Stadium in Oklahoma City, OK from May 9 through May 11, 2008. Texas A&M won their first conference tournament and earned the Big 12 Conference's automatic bid to the 2008 NCAA Division I softball tournament. 

Texas A&M would go on to play in the 2008 Women's College World Series.

Standings
Source:

Schedule
Source:

All-Tournament Team
Source:

References

Big 12 Conference softball tournament
Tournament
Big 12 softball tournament